Lamine is an unincorporated community in Lamine Township, in Cooper County, in the U.S. State of Missouri.

History
Lamine was laid out in 1888, from land dedicated by John A. Fray,  Martha E. Fray, Columbus Higgerson, and Mary F. Higgerson as witnessed on 24 July 1888 by Harvey Chalfant Turley, William Holland Turley, and Anna B. (Herndon) Turley with W. G. Pendleton as the Notary Public ...(see 1888 Dedication of Lamine).
Lamine takes its name from the nearby Lamine River.  The river was named by Renaudière "Rivière a la Mine" in 1723.  In 1720 Renaudière had been sent by Renault, the Director of Mines of the French colonies in America to find gold and silver west of the Mississippi River.  He found lead in La Mine, but no silver or gold.

Lamine is the only town ("unincorporated community") in the greater Lamine Township.

A post office called La Mine was established in 1838, and remained in operation until 1924 when "La Mine" became "Lamine".

About 1843 the Church of Christ was organized in Lamine but it disbanded after a few years due to deaths and removals and was reconstituted on August 7, 1865 by Elder P. Donan with the following white members: Samuel R. and Sara F. Collins, Drusilla E. Thomas, Susan Biddle, Melinda E. Kincaid, Mary F. Tyler, Catherine and Freeman Wing, Julia O. Turley, Ellen Pope, Josephine and J. P. Wall, Moses Napier, Mary J. Mellor, Nancy Reed, Elizabeth Courtney, George W., Francis M., A. L., and Richard Kincaid, John B. and Martha J. Baker, Theodore Turley, James O. Howell, Thomas Miller, Thomas Staples, C. F. Younger, T. Harris, Lucy C. Kincheloe, and Pamela Williams.  There were 18 "colored" members whose names were not recorded and they formed their own church shortly thereafter.

Sam Walton (1846-1894) opened a "business house" in Lamine in 1869.  Sam Walton's grandson Sam Walton (1918-1992) would go on to establish Wal-Mart as a retailing giant.

Brothers-in-law John T. Redd and Thomas B. Gibson (1830-1920) opened a general store in Lamine in 1871.  The store's safe was blown open in 1881 by robbers who stole $700.

The last store to operate in Lamine, Turley's Store, was owned and operated by Bill and Gerrie Turley from 1958 to its closing in 1984.  Bill Turley was the 2x-great grandson of Stephen Turley (1786-1851), one of the very first white settlers of Lamine township.

Mellor Village and Mounds Archeological District, one of the known Hopewell Indian settlements located at the confluence of the Lamine and Missouri rivers in the Lamine township, was listed on the National Register of Historic Places in 1969 with a boundary increase in 1974.

References

Unincorporated communities in Cooper County, Missouri
Unincorporated communities in Missouri